Vanish may refer to:

 Vanish (toilet cleaner), a toilet bowl cleaner by S.C. Johnson
 Vanish (stain remover), a brand of cloth cleaning product by Reckitt
 "Vanish" an episode of the TV series Criss Angel Mindfreak
 Vanishing, a type of magical effect
 Vanish (mathematics), said of a mathematical function that gives the value a zero at some argument (a root of the function)
 Vanish (computer science), a project at the University of Washington to protect online personal data
 Vanish (film), a 2015 American thriller film stylized as VANish
 Vanish (comic), a 2022 series published by Image Comics

See also
 Forced disappearance
 Vanished (disambiguation)
 Vanishing (disambiguation)
 Varnish (disambiguation)